USS Kirk was a  destroyer escort, originally designated as DE-1087 and reclassified as a frigate, FF-1087 (1975), in the United States Navy. Her primary mission of ASW remained unchanged. She was named for Admiral Alan Goodrich Kirk. She is in service with the Taiwanese navy as the ROCN Fen Yang (FFG-934).

Her contract was awarded to Avondale Marine on 25 August 1966. Kirk was laid down on 4 December 1970, launched on 25 September 1971 and commissioned on 9 September 1972.

Service history
In April 1975 Kirk participated in Operation Eagle Pull, the evacuation of Phnom Penh, Cambodia, and Operation Frequent Wind, the evacuation of Saigon, Vietnam.

As part of the U.S. fleet sent to facilitate the evacuation of Americans from South Vietnam, USS Kirk carried out one of the most significant humanitarian missions in U.S. military history. Commanded by Commander Paul H. (Jake) Jacobs and under the direction of a civilian, Richard Armitage, Kirk rescued the remainder of the South Vietnamese Navy, consisting of 18 ships and tens of thousands of Vietnamese refugees, leading and protecting the flotilla from Vietnamese waters to the Philippines. From there, most of the refugees ultimately emigrated to the United States.

During the evacuation, the Kirk became a makeshift landing pad for a stream of fourteen helicopters flown by South Vietnamese airmen fleeing for their lives with their families and friends on board. Having only a small flight deck, Kirk had nowhere to store the helicopters so the crew pushed all but three overboard into the China Sea. Early one morning while on station, the crew of the Kirk rescued two Marine pilots after their USMC AH-1J Cobra gunship crashed into the ocean near the ship.  This was the last helicopter-gunship to be lost in Vietnam. The final refugees the Kirk received were literally tossed out of a hovering Boeing CH-47 Chinook that was too large to land on Kirk. Once the passengers were safely aboard, the pilot steered the craft about 50 yards aft of Kirks stern, and jumped from the hovering helicopter. The craft then crashed into the water over the submerged pilot. He successfully surfaced and, after rescue by Kirk sailors, joined his family on board the American frigate.

In 2010, under the direction of VADM Adam Robinson, then Surgeon General of the U.S. Navy, the U.S. Navy created a documentary entitled The Lucky Few. It has since been translated into Vietnamese as well.

Decommissioning and Taiwanese service

She served in the U.S. Navy up until 6 August 1993, when the ship was decommissioned and leased to Republic of China Navy in Taiwan. In Taiwanese service she was renamed Fen Yang with the hull number changed to 934. On 29 September 1999, the ship was finally purchased by Taiwan.

See also

References

External links
 Reunion organization site
 Maritimequest USS Kirk DE-1087/FF-1087 Photo Gallery
 USS Kirk (FF1087) Operation Frequent Wind gallery
 Forgotten Ship: A Lifesaving Mission As Saigon Fell – slideshow by NPR
 "Last Days in Vietnam" NPR broadcast April, 29, 2015

1971 ships
Knox-class frigates
Ships built in Bridge City, Louisiana
Ships transferred from the United States Navy to the Republic of China Navy
Cold War frigates and destroyer escorts of the United States